Squash at the 2015 Southeast Asian Games was held in Kallang Squash Centre, in Kallang, Singapore from 9 to 15 June 2015.

Participating nations
A total of 41 athletes from six nations will be competing in squash at the 2015 Southeast Asian Games:

Medalists

Medal table

References

External links
  

 
Kallang